The 2002 Generali Open was a men's tennis tournament played on outdoor clay courts at the Tennis Stadium Kitzbühel in Kitzbühel in Austria and was part of the International Series Gold of the 2002 ATP Tour. It was the 47th edition of the tournament and ran from 22 July until 28 July 2002. Àlex Corretja won the singles title.

Finals

Singles

 Àlex Corretja defeated  Juan Carlos Ferrero 6–4, 6–1, 6–3
 It was Corretja's 2nd title of the year and the 20th of his career.

Doubles

 Robbie Koenig /  Thomas Shimada defeated  Lucas Arnold /  Àlex Corretja 7–6(7–3), 6–4
 It was Koenig's 1st title of the year and the 1st of his career. It was Shimada's only title of the year and the 2nd of his career.

References

External links
 ITF tournament edition details

Generali Open
Austrian Open Kitzbühel
2002 in Austrian tennis